Frédéric Protat  (born 17 July 1966) is a French former professional motorcycle racer. He was the 1991 250cc French superbike champion.

Born in Bron, Protat began his career in Grand Prix motorcycle racing in the 1989 season riding an Aprilia in the 250cc class at the 1989 French motorcycle Grand Prix. He later participated with Aprilia again in 1991 in the 250 cc class. Between 1992 and 1994 he took part in championships sometimes with Honda, and sometimes with Aprilia.

1995 saw Protat move up to the 500cc class riding an ROC Yamaha. In 1996, he was the highest ranking privateer in the 500cc class, finishing the season in 15th place. Protat's final season in the 500cc class was in 1997 riding a Honda.

He scored 12 points in the 250cc Grand Prix class and 41 points in 500cc category.
In 1998 and 1999 he participated in the World Superbike Championship for Ducati.
In 1999 he was vice champion of France on a Ducati superbike.
In 2000 and 2001 he won the French Superbike Championship on a Ducati Superbike.
In 2002 he was vice champion of France on Ducati.
In 2006, he won the 24 Hours of Le Mans motorcycle endurance race along with Olivier Four and Daniel Ribalta-Bosch riding a Honda CBR.

Grand Prix results

References

External links 
 Frédéric Protat statistics at MotoGP.com

Living people
1966 births
People from Bron
French motorcycle racers
250cc World Championship riders
500cc World Championship riders
Superbike World Championship riders
Sportspeople from Lyon Metropolis